Frank Rikhart Sokoy (born 5 October 1997) is an Indonesian professional footballer who plays as a left back for Liga 1 club PS Barito Putera.

Club career

Persebaya Surabaya
He was signed for Persebaya Surabaya to play in Liga 1 in the 2021 season. Sokoy made his league debut on 4 September 2021 in a match against Borneo at the Wibawa Mukti Stadium, Cikarang.

Barito Putera
Sokoy was signed for Barito Putera to play in Liga 1 in the 2022–23 season. He made his league debut on 23 July 2022 in a match against Madura United at the Gelora Ratu Pamelingan Stadium, Pamekasan.

Career statistics

Club

Notes

References

External links
 Frank Sokoy at Soccerway
 Frank Sokoy at Liga Indonesia

1997 births
Living people
People from Jayapura
Indonesian footballers
Persebaya Surabaya players
PS Barito Putera players
Liga 1 (Indonesia) players
Association football defenders
Sportspeople from Papua